The Forty-First Wisconsin Legislature convened from  to  in regular session.  

This was the first legislative session after the redistricting of the Senate and Assembly according to an act of the previous session.

Senators representing even-numbered districts were newly elected for this session and were serving the first two years of a four-year term. Assembly members were elected to a two-year term. Assembly members and even-numbered senators were elected in the general election of November 8, 1892. Senators representing odd-numbered districts were serving the third and fourth year of a four-year term, having been elected in the general election of November 4, 1890.

Major events
 January 17, 1893: Hawaiian queen Liliʻuokalani was overthrown by American agents with the assistance of United States marines, ending the Hawaiian monarchy.
 January 27, 1893: John L. Mitchell was elected United States Senator by the Wisconsin Legislature in joint session.
 March 4, 1893: Inauguration of Grover Cleveland as the 24th President of the United States.
 April 7, 1893: Alfred W. Newman was elected to the Wisconsin Supreme Court, to the seat being vacated by the retirement of William P. Lyon.
 May 5, 1893: A crash of the New York Stock Exchange began the Panic of 1893.
 June 4, 1893: The Anti-Saloon League was incorporated at Oberlin, Ohio.
 January 1, 1894: As the senior-most member of the court, Harlow S. Orton became the 8th chief justice of the Wisconsin Supreme Court due to the retirement of William P. Lyon. 
 April 4, 1894: Wisconsin lieutenant governor Charles Jonas resigned from office to accept appointment as U.S. consul to Saint Petersburg, Russia.
 April 21, 1894: The bituminous coal miners' strike of 1894 began, shutting down coal mines across the United States.
 July 4, 1894: The Republic of Hawaii was proclaimed by American agents.
 August 27, 1894: The Wilson–Gorman Tariff Act, which slightly reduced tariffs and imposed a tax on incomes over $4000, became law without the signature of President Grover Cleveland.
 November 6, 1894: William H. Upham elected Governor of Wisconsin.

Major legislation
 April 19, 1893: An Act to make labor day a legal holiday, 1893 Act 271.
 Joint Resolution in relation to immigration, 1893 Joint Resolution 3.  Expressing opposition to proposed immigration restrictions being considered in Congress.
 Joint Resolution to amend section 1, article 10, of the constitution of the state of Wisconsin, 1893 Joint Resolution 10. This was another attempt to update the section of the state constitution referring to the Superintendent of Public Instruction of Wisconsin to attempt to remove the constitutional limit on annual compensation.  The previous attempt was rejected by voters in the 1888 general election.
 Joint Resolution proposing an amendment to subdivision 9, of section 31, of article 4, of the constitution of the state of Wisconsin, 1893 Joint Resolution 15.  This was a proposed amendment to the state constitution to undo a constitutional amendment which had just been approved by the voters in 1892.

Party summary

Senate summary

Assembly summary

Sessions
 1st Regular session: January 11, 1893April 21, 1893

Leaders

Senate leadership
 President of the Senate: Charles Jonas (D) 
 President pro tempore: Robert MacBride (D)

Assembly leadership
 Speaker of the Assembly: Edward Keogh (D)

Members

Members of the Senate
Members of the Senate for the Forty-First Wisconsin Legislature:

Members of the Assembly
Members of the Assembly for the Forty-First Wisconsin Legislature:

Committees

Senate committees
 Senate Committee on AgricultureAdam Apple, chair
 Senate Committee on Assessment and Collection of TaxesSamuel Smead, chair
 Senate Committee on EducationRussel C. Falconer, chair
 Senate Committee on Enrolled BillsWilliam F. Voss, chair
 Senate Committee on Engrossed BillsDayne Wescott, chair
 Senate Committee on Federal RelationsOscar Altpeter, chair
 Senate Committee on Finance, Banks, and InsuranceFerdinand Yahr, chair
 Senate Committee on IncorporationsRobert J. MacBride, chair
 Senate Committee on the JudiciaryWilliam Kennedy, chair
 Senate Committee on Legislative ExpendituresRobert McGeehan, chair
 Senate Committee on Manufacturing and CommerceChristian Koenitzer, chair
 Senate Committee on Military AffairsAlbert Solliday, chair
 Senate Committee on Privileges and ElectionsJ. W. Murphy, chair
 Senate Committee on Public LandsHenry Conner, chair
 Senate Committee on RailroadsG. W. Pratt, chair
 Senate Committee on Roads and BridgesJohn Fetzer, chair
 Senate Committee on State AffairsRobert Lees, chair
 Senate Committee on Town and County OrganizationsJohn T. Kingston, chair

Assembly committees
 Assembly Committee on AgricultureWilliam Schwefel, chair
 Assembly Committee on Assessment and Collection of TaxesJ. W. Parkinson, chair
 Assembly Committee on Bills on their Third ReadingD. Jennings, chair
 Assembly Committee on CitiesPeter J. Rademacher, chair
 Assembly Committee on EducationA. O. Wilson, chair
 Assembly Committee on Engrossed BillsH. C. Hunt, chair
 Assembly Committee on Enrolled BillsJ. Deuster, chair
 Assembly Committee on Federal RelationsJ. W. Liebenstein, chair
 Assembly Committee on IncorporationsH. F. Hagemeister, chair
 Assembly Committee on Insurance, Banks, and BankingGustave S. Luscher, chair
 Assembly Committee on the JudiciaryM. E. Burke, chair
 Assembly Committee on Labor and ManufacturesP. J. Conway, chair
 Assembly Committee on Legislative ExpendituresC. Hugo Jacobi, chair
 Assembly Committee on Lumber and MiningW. Peter Wheelihan, chair
 Assembly Committee on Medical SocietiesC. E. Quigg, chair
 Assembly Committee on MilitiaGeorge Abert, chair
 Assembly Committee on Privileges and ElectionsJ. Montgomery Smith, chair
 Assembly Committee on Public ImprovementsJoseph Filz, chair
 Assembly Committee on Public LandsJohn Schmidt, chair
 Assembly Committee on RailroadsB. E. Sampson, chair
 Assembly Committee on Roads and BridgesCharles Couch, chair
 Assembly Committee on State AffairsJohn Ringle, chair
 Assembly Committee on Town and County OrganizationM. G. McGeehan, chair
 Assembly Committee on Ways and MeansA. Konrad, chair

Joint committees
 Joint Committee on Charitable and Penal InstitutionsJ. H. Woodnorth (Sen.) & John Tracy (Asm.), co-chairs
 Joint Committee on ClaimsW. F. Nash (Sen.) & W. H. Fitzgerald (Asm.), co-chairs
 Joint Committee on Fish and Game D. E. Wescott (Sen.) & C. W. Heyl (Asm.), co-chairs
 Joint Committee on PrintingM. Kruszka (Sen.) & L. A. Lange (Asm.), co-chairs
 Joint Committee on the World's FairJ. H. Woodnorth (Sen.) & A. O. Wilson (Asm.), co-chairs

Changes from the 40th Legislature
New districts for the 41st Legislature were defined in 1892 Wisconsin Special Session 2 Act 1, passed into law in the 40th Wisconsin Legislature.

Senate redistricting

Summary of changes
 Only 1 district was left unchanged (25).
 Fond du Lac County became its own district (18) after previously having been split between two districts.
 Milwaukee County went from having 4 districts to 4 (4, 5, 6, 8) plus one district shared with Waukesha County (7).
 Only three single-county districts remain (18, 19, 20).
 Seven counties are split between multi-county senate districts.

Senate districts

Assembly redistricting

Summary of changes
 25 districts were left unchanged.
 Ashland County became its own district after previously having been in a shared district with Florence, Forest, Oneida, and Price counties.
 Buffalo and Pepin were combined into a shared district after previously having each been separate districts.
 Douglas County became its own district after previously having been in a shared district with Bayfield, Burnett, Sawyer, and Washburn counties.
 Grant County went from having 2 districts to 1.
 Iowa County went from having 2 districts to 1.
 Lincoln County became its own district after previously having been in a shared district with Langlade and Taylor.
 Milwaukee County went from having 12 districts to 14.
 Monroe County went from having 2 districts to 1.
 Racine County went from having 1 district to 2.
 Vernon County went from having 2 districts to 1.

Assembly districts

Employees

Senate employees
 Chief Clerk: Sam J. Shafer
 Assistant Chief Clerk: Franklin Bowen
 Journal Clerk: Jackson Silbaugh
 Bookkeeper: Edward Malone
 Assistant Bookkepper: P. T. Diamond
 Engrossing Clerk: Will N. Wells
 Assistant Engrossing Clerk: Thomas O'Hara
 Enrolling Clerk: John G. Faulds
 Assistant Enrolling Clerk: Hames McBrien
 Proofreader: Anton Boex
 Index Clerk: Jessie Knowles
 Assistant Index Clerk: May Armstrong
 Clerk for the Judiciary Committee: William F. Collins
 Clerk for the Committee on Incorporations: Robert J. MacBride Jr.
 Clerk for the Committee on Claims: W. H. Wieboldt
 Clerk for the Committee on Town and County Organization: Bert Williams
 Clerk for the Committee on Charitable and Penal Institutions: B. A. Weatherby
 Clerk for the Committee on Railroads: R. B. Pratt
 Clerk for the Committee on Engrossed Bills: Minnie LeClaire
 Clerk for the Committee on Enrolled Bills: Fred Smith
 Document Clerk: Frank W. Teske
 Comparing Clerks:
 Nellie Gates
 Lizzie Jahnke
 C. T. Bundy
 A. P. Deignan
 General Clerks:
 J. T. Sims
 E. R. Petherick
 O. F. Huhn
 Clifford P. Best
 Joseph Mashek
 Ruling Clerk: Anna Hurley
 Printing Page: Noel Nash
 Sergeant-at-Arms: J. R. Becker
 Assistant Sergeant-at-Arms: K. Owocki
 Postmaster: Michael W. Ryan
 Assistant Postmaster: A. Wagener
 Gallery Attendants: N. Biever
 General Attendants: 
 J. O'Rourk
 J. W. Reed
 Document Room Attendant: Carl Schneider
 Committee Room Attendants:
 Thomas Kennedy
 R. Huyck
 J. J. Jacobs
 Carl Felker
 Doorkeepers:
 R. Tuttle
 S. Sherwood
 S. C. Baas
 R. Carey
 Night Watch: John Arendt
 Janitor: R. M. Burk
 Custodian of the Enrolling Room: J. M. Frey
 Custodian of the Engrossing Room: George Malone
 Night Laborer: John D. Fay
 Messengers:
 R. E. Taylor
 M. Norris
 Charles Seller
 John Hayes
 Bert Levy
 Don Frank
 M. Baumgartner
 B. Husting
 H. Tierney
 A. Cavenaugh
 J. A. Adamson
 Bernie Erickson

Assembly employees
 Chief Clerk: G. W. Porth
 Assistant Chief Clerk: E. D. Doney
 Journal Clerk: John E. Wright
 Assistant Journal Clerk: Louis K. Wright
 Bookkeeper: William Mayworm
 Assistant Bookkeeper: Joseph D. O'Brien
 Engrossing Clerk: S. D. Goodell
 Assistant Engrossing Clerk: Tom Overland
 Enrolling Clerk: A. Goerz
 Assistant Enrolling Clerk: J. J. Gleason
 Index Clerk: Charles A. Leicht
 Assistant Index Clerk: Willard Temple
 Stationary Clerk: Elmer Skelly
 Proof Reader: F. A. Bartlett
 Copy Holder: Bessie Lusk
 Ruling Clerk: W. J. Taylor
 Comparing Clerk: Charles Reuschlein
 General Clerks:
 James Carroll
 C. B. Goodwin
 George Silbernagel
 Ed Conway Jr.
 Clerk for the Judiciary Committee: F. M. Shaughnessy
 Stenographer for the Judiciary Committee: Hattie Pier
 Clerk for the Committee on Enrolled Bills: Thomas McBean
 Clerk for the Committee on Engrossed Bills: C. W. Hunt
 Clerk for the Committee on Incorporations: Pat Ryan
 Clerk for the Committee on State Affairs: William Ringle
 Clerk for the Committee on Railroads: Ella Graham
 Clerk for the Committee on Privileges and Elections: A. S. White
 Clerk for the Committee on Insurance, Banks, and Banking: George Coughran
 Clerk for the Committee on Town and County Organization: W. P. Hyland
 Clerk for the Committee on Bills on Third Reading: E. L. Hardy
 Document Clerk: J. A. Venus
 Sergeant-at-Arms: Theodore Knapstein
 Assistant Sergeant-at-Arms: John H. Rooney
 Postmaster: William McMullen
 Assistant Postmaster: G. T. McElroy
 Doorkeepers:
 S. Hanizeski
 Ole Neilson
 Casper Lebeis
 T. E. Chubbuck
 General Attendant: Albert Stoppenbach
 Document Room Attendant: Ulrich Wettstein
 Gallery Attendants:
 August C. Mann
 F. Herman
 Committee Room Attendants: 
 L. J. Evans
 George Nebel
 John F. Harnes
 D. C. Clune
 Valentine Klesges
 Joseph E. Grassberger
 Robert Plisch
 A. D. Kildowe
 T. A. Blackwell
 Porter: John Pinzger
 Flagman: Byron Moore
 Night Watch: Fred Bishop
 Custodian of the Enrolling Room: George Sherer
 Custodian of the Engrossing Room: C. J. Courtenan
 Committee Room Custodians:
 Joseph Hortel
 William Croll
 Wash Room Attendant: Jacob Beth
 Cloak Room Attendants: 
 John O'Keefe
 Peter Spehn
 Janitor: William Fahringer
 Messengers:
 James Whitty
 John Conway
 Frank Sims
 Frank Shealy
 Eddie Ballschmider
 Arthur Gardener
 Bennie Dodge
 Thomas Burke
 Archie McCoy
 S. Andrzejewski
 Louis Corey
 Everett Monshan

Notes

References

External links
 1893: Related Documents from Wisconsin Legislature

1893 in Wisconsin
1894 in Wisconsin
Wisconsin
Wisconsin legislative sessions